Andrew Mills may refer to:

Andrew Mills (Australian footballer) (born 1981), Australian rules footballer
Andrew Mills (English footballer) (born 1994), English goalkeeper
Andrew Harwood Mills (born 1980), English actor
A. J. Mills (politician), member of the Washington House of Representatives